Jan Jansson may refer to:
Jan Janssonius, (1588 - 1664), also known as Jan Jansson and Jan Janszoon, Dutch cartographer who lived and worked in Amsterdam in the 17th century
Jan Jansson (footballer) (born 1968), Swedish footballer

See also
Jan Jansen (disambiguation)
Jan Jansohn, guitarist
Jan Janssen (disambiguation)